Matthew Frye Jacobson is a historian whose research concerns politics and race in all eras of American history. He is the Sterling Professor of American Studies and History and Professor of African American Studies at Yale University. From 2012–2013 he was president of the American Studies Association.

Education 
Jacobson earned a BA from Evergreen State College and an MA from Boston College. He received his doctorate in American Civilization in 1992 from Brown University.

Works 
Special Sorrows: The Diasporic Imagination of Irish, Polish, and Jewish Immigrants in the United States (1995)
Whiteness of a Different Color: European Immigrants and the Alchemy of Race (1998)
Barbarian Virtues: The United States Encounters Foreign Peoples at Home and Abroad, 1876-1917 (2000)
Roots Too: White Ethnic Revival in Post-Civil Rights America (2005)
What Have They Built You to Do?: The Manchurian Candidate and Cold War America (with Gaspar González, 2006)

References

Year of birth missing (living people)
Living people
21st-century American historians
21st-century American male writers
Brown University alumni
Yale University faculty
American male non-fiction writers
Evergreen State College alumni
Boston College alumni